Armand Peri (born July 14, 1965)  is an American  bodybuilder, artist, author and entrepreneur known as the founder and CEO of New York City's Hunk-O-Mania nightclub and its associated entertainment brand.

Early life and education
Peri was born and raised in Vila do Conde, (Porto District) Portugal. At 12 years old, Peri and his family migrated to the United States and he later became a US citizen. Peri began art at a young age, eventually winning state and national art competitions as a youth, including this National Art Competition for the Endowment of the Arts. For winning this competition, he was given the opportunity to meet President Ronald Reagan and First Lady Nancy Reagan in Washington, D.C. Art also encouraged Peri to pursue his ideal physique, which made him venture into bodybuilding, a niche where he has won prizes.

He studied at the School of Visual Arts in New York City, before switching his field of study to architecture and eventually receiving his BA from the New Jersey Institute of Technology.

Career

Prior to starting his own company, Peri worked as a bouncer, an architectural renderer, and a dancer at Long Island-based male entertainment revue Escapes.

Peri founded Hunk-O-Mania Entertainment in 1998 and began the first show in New York City known as Show Nightclub. Peri also served as the owner of the Star Nightclub in New York City.

Peri is an artist who often creates self-portraits to help himself build and maintain his ideal physique. This made him venture into bodybuilding, a niche where he has won prizes.

In 1993, Peri played a part in Brian De Palma's Carlito's Way alongside Al Pacino as his bodyguard.

Peri attended and showcased his art at Art Basel 2018 in Miami.

Peri published the book Unparalleled Success in 2019, which covered his experiences as both an immigrant and an entrepreneur.

In 2021, Peri signed a partnership deal to provide nightlife entertainment to New York City’s Harbor nightclub.

Peri owns a public relations and social media marketing company named New Age PR Agency.

Awards and honors
 1984 - NPC Teen New Jersey Bodybuilding Championship - Teen Overall Winner
 1993 - Mr. New Jersey Heavy-weight Winner

Personal life

Peri married Bonita de la Parra and had a child with her. He married his second wife Francielle Melo, and they have three children.

References

Living people
American chief executives
1965 births
American bodybuilders